Jean-François Fortin (born September 12, 1973) is a Canadian politician. He was elected to represent the riding of Haute-Gaspésie—La Mitis—Matane—Matapédia in the 2011 federal election as a member of the Bloc Québécois, and was chosen interim parliamentary leader of the Bloc on February 26, 2014.

On August 12, 2014, Fortin quit the party to sit as an independent, saying that the  Bloc Québécois he had joined no longer exists and that new party leader Mario Beaulieu had destroyed its credibility.

On October 21, 2014, Fortin, along with Jean-François Larose, the NDP MP for Repentigny, announced that they were forming Strength in Democracy, a new Quebec-centred political party dedicated to representing the province's regions. In the 2015 federal election he ran for the new riding of Avignon—La Mitis—Matane—Matapédia and lost to Liberal Rémi Massé.

Early life
Prior to being elected to parliament, Fortin was a professor of political science at Cégep de Rimouski from 2001 until 2011. He was also elected as a city councillor in Sainte-Flavie in 2003 and served a term as mayor from 2006 until 2009.

Political career
Fortin was one of only four Bloc Québécois MPs elected in the 2011 federal election which saw the party's caucus reduced from 47 to 4 and was the only non-incumbent Bloc candidate to win election. He won the seat of Haute-Gaspésie—La Mitis—Matane—Matapédia, which had been vacated by fellow Bloc Québécois politician Jean-Yves Roy who resigned from Parliament in late 2010 because of ill health.

On September 17, 2011, Fortin declared his candidacy in the Bloc Québécois leadership election that was held to choose a successor to Gilles Duceppe. He was defeated on the first ballot on December 11, 2011.

Fortin considered running in the 2014 party leadership election but decided to back André Bellavance. On August 12, 2014, almost two months after Mario Beaulieu's upset victory, Fortin quit the Bloc Quebecois to sit as an Independent accusing Beaulieu of "pushing a unidimensional, intransigent agenda that lacks rigour has put an end to the credibility established by (former leaders) Gilles Duceppe and followed up by Daniel Paillé, two leaders who merit great respect." He continued, saying that "Beaulieu is dividing sovereignists instead of uniting them."  In October, Fortin and another MP announced the formation of the Strength in Democracy party, which sat in the Canadian legislature with Fortin as leader.

In the 2015 federal election Fortin ran for the redistributed riding of Avignon—La Mitis—Matane—Matapédia under the Strength In Democracy banner.  He lost to Liberal Rémi Massé, coming in fourth.

Election results

References

External links

1973 births
Living people
Bloc Québécois MPs
Independent MPs in the Canadian House of Commons
Members of the House of Commons of Canada from Quebec
Mayors of places in Quebec
Strength in Democracy MPs
21st-century Canadian politicians
French Quebecers